The Suvodol Coal Mine is a coal mine located in Bitola Municipality, Pelagonia Statistical Region. The mine has coal reserves amounting to 175 million tonnes of lignite, one of the largest coal reserves in Europe and the world and has an annual production of 6.5 million tonnes of coal.

References 

Coal mines in North Macedonia
Bitola Municipality